Herb Breau,  (born December 5, 1944) is a Canadian businessman and former politician.

Born in Haut-Sheila, New Brunswick, Breau was a Liberal Member of Parliament (MP) representing Gloucester from the 1968 election until his defeat in the 1984 election that reduced the Liberal caucus to only 40 MPs.

Breau served as a parliamentary secretary in the 1970s. He served as chairman of the Parliamentary Task Forces on North-South Relations and on Fiscal Federalism in Canada, chairman of the Parliamentary Association of Canada-United States from 1977 to 1981, and a member of the Trilateral Commission from 1981 to 1984.

Breau was appointed to Cabinet as Minister of Fisheries and Oceans when John Turner became Prime Minister of Canada in June 1984. His ministerial career ended just over two months later as a result of the election that defeated the Turner government.

He entered the private sector following the end of his political career, and has most recently been an executive at Syscan International, serving as Acting Chief Executive Officer from 2000 to 2001.

Breau served on the board of governors of the International Development Research Centre (IDRC) in the 1990s as an appointee of the federal government.

Breau currently serves on the board of directors of the Pearson Centre for Progressive Policy.

Electoral record

References

External links

1944 births
Members of the House of Commons of Canada from New Brunswick
Liberal Party of Canada MPs
Members of the King's Privy Council for Canada
Living people
Members of the 23rd Canadian Ministry